WSBA (910 kHz, "NewsTalk 93.9 & 910 WSBA") is a commercial AM radio station licensed to York, Pennsylvania. The station is owned by Cumulus Media, through licensee Radio License Holding SRC, LLC.  It broadcasts a talk radio format.  The radio studios are on Susquehanna Plaza Drive near U.S. Route 30.

By the day, WSBA is powered at 5,000 watts. But at night, to protect other stations on 910 AM from interference, WSBA reduces power to 1,000 watts. It uses a directional antenna with a four-tower array at all times. The transmitter is on Susquehanna Trail in York. Programming is also heard on 250 watt FM translator W230CQ at 93.9 MHz. It is also simulcast on the HD Radio digital subchannel of sister station 96.1 WSOX-HD2.

Programming
Weekdays begin with the "WSBA Morning News" hosted by Gary Sutton.  The rest of the weekday schedule is largely made up of nationally syndicated conservative talk shows, including Brian Kilmeade, Dan Bongino, Ben Shapiro, Michael Knowles, Mark Levin, Dave Ramsey, Red Eye Radio and America in the Morning.  Most hours begin with world and national news from Fox News Radio.  WSBA also carries Baltimore Orioles baseball games and Baltimore Ravens football games.

History

Waiting for sign-on
An article in the Gazette and Daily on July 24, 1942, discussed the new radio station. The article quoted the Station Manager Robert L. Kauffman as saying the station would go on air sometime in the late summer. Otis Morse would be the Program Director and Willis Weaver would be the chief engineer.

An advertisement in the Gazette and Daily on August 26, 1942,(Page 2 bottom of Column 1), stated, "On the air soon - 900 the mid-point on your dial." The ad was repeated on August 27, August 28 and August 29th.  The announcement of the first day on September 1, 1942, came in The Gazette and Daily on August 31, 1942. 
The September 1, 1942 Gazette and Daily Page 2 article announced, 'WSBA On the Air Today'.

First day
The station signed on the air with a prayer by the Rev. Paul E. V. Shannon of the first United Brethren Church.  York Mayor Harry B. Anstine read his Heroes Day proclamation. Much of the programming reflected that the nation was nearing the end of the first year of World War II.

The station had a 240-foot antenna and a 1,000 watt transmitter. An advertisement on page 3 that day called WSBA "York's own radio station."

Nearby, 580 WHP in Harrisburg went on the air in 1925, predating WSBA by 17 years. WLXW (now WHYL) in Carlisle was first on the air in 1948, six years after WSBA and WGET in Gettysburg first aired August 27, 1950. WHVR AM in Hanover went into operation on January 2, 1949 on 1280 kHz with a power of 1000 watts.

Other stations in York in the 1950-1970 period included WORK and WNOW-FM and WNOW (AM) which was mainly country.

Moving to AM 910
WSBA moved from 900 to 910 kHz in October 1949. It still continued to be listed in radio listings as the old frequency 900 kHz through the middle 50s when the Gazette and Daily discontinued the radio listings.

The move allowed WSBA to increase its daytime power to 5,000 watts.  WSBA's move to 910 is discussed in more detail in the Publication, Susquehanna First 50 Years by Phillip K. Eberly.

Full service MOR
During the 1950-1980 period WSBA carried a full service, middle of the road (MOR) format of popular music, news and sports.  Ed Wickenheiser was one of the newscasters in the earliest reporting of the "Three Mile Island accident" in 1979 and is cited in the book TMI by investigative reporter Mark Lane.

During Hurricane Agnes and Eloise, snowstorms and other weather events, WSBA had frequent updates and information. When disasters hit, regular programming stopped. During the late 50s and early 60s, the station did a rundown of the top 40 on Saturday afternoon.

Ralph Lockwood was a long term morning host during that period and had a fictional sidekick Luscious Laverne. Ed Lincoln was another personality at that time who had a feature, the hit of the week, which was played every night on his program. That was available in Sol Kessler's Hi Fi Shop for $.59 during that week. This is noted in an advertisement in The Gazette and Daily April 26, 1957.

WSBA-FM

WSBA management decided to add an FM station. On November 21, 1947, manager Otis Morse IV spoke to the York Exchange Club about frequency modulation (FM) radio.  WSBA-FM first appears in a programming guide on February 28, 1949, in the Hanover Sun.  The station was on the air at 103.3 MHz, largely simulcasting AM 910.

In an article appears in the January 7, 1950, York Gazette and Daily.  A seminar was being presented featuring Otis Morse from WSBA and others from WNOW-AM, WORK-AM, and WRZE-FM 98.3 (Per radio listing The Evening Sun May 12, 1953) were participating.

During the 1960s and 1970s, WSBA was a leading top 40 music station in the Harrisburg-York-Lancaster area.  It was also the flagship station of Susquehanna Radio's top 40 stations (which also included WHLO, WARM, and WICE).

Cumulus ownership
On October 31, 2005, Cumulus Media announced the creation of a new private partnership, Cumulus Media Partners, LLC, formed with Bain Capital, The Blackstone Group and Thomas H. Lee Partners, to purchase Susquehanna Radio Corporation for approximately $1.2 billion. The purchase was completed on May 5, 2006.

At that time, the license for WSBA was transferred to Radio License Holding SRC, LLC., a division of Cumulus Media Partners Susquehanna Corporation.

On July 20, 2017, translator W253AC (now W230CQ), licensed to York, began simulcasting WSBA programming.

Translator
WSBA programming is simulcast on the following translator:

References

External links

The O's on WSBA

SBA
York, Pennsylvania
News and talk radio stations in the United States
Radio stations established in 1942
Cumulus Media radio stations
1942 establishments in Pennsylvania